Machiavellianism or Machiavellian may refer to:

Politics
Machiavellianism (politics), the supposed political philosophy of Niccolò Machiavelli
Political realism

Psychology
Machiavellianism (psychology), a personality trait centered on cold and manipulative behavior
Machiavellianism in the workplace
Machiavellian intelligence, concept in primatology that deals with the ability to be in a successful political engagement with social groups

Other
Machiavellian (horse), 1987–2004, an American racehorse

See also
 The Prince, 16th-century political treatise by Machiavelli